The German torpedo boat T26 was one of fifteen Type 39 torpedo boats built for the Kriegsmarine (German Navy) during World War II. Completed in early 1943, the boat was transferred to France in August. T26 helped to lay a minefield in the English Channel the following month, and later escorted a blockade runner through the Bay of Biscay. She participated in the Battle of Sept-Îles in October and was sunk two months later by a British light cruiser during the Battle of the Bay of Biscay.

Design and description
The Type 39 torpedo boat was conceived as a general-purpose design, much larger than preceding German torpedo boats. Their crew numbered 206 officers and sailors. The Type 39s were fitted with a pair of geared steam turbine sets, each driving one propeller, using steam from four high-pressure water-tube boilers.

As built, the Type 39 ships mounted four  SK C/32 guns in single mounts protected by gun shields; one forward of the superstructure, one between the funnels, and two aft, one superfiring over the other. Anti-aircraft defense was provided by four  SK C/30 AA guns in two twin-gun mounts on platforms abaft the rear funnel, six  C/38 guns in one quadruple mount on the aft superstructure and a pair of single mounts on the bridge wings. They carried six above-water  torpedo tubes in two triple mounts amidships and could also carry 30 mines; the full complement of 60 mines made the ships top-heavy which could be dangerous in bad weather). For anti-submarine work the boats were fitted with a S-Gerät sonar and four depth charge launchers. The Type 39s were equipped with a FuMO 21 radar and various FumB radar detectors were installed late in the war.

Construction and career
Originally ordered as a Type 37 torpedo boat on 30 March 1939, T26 was reordered on 10 November 1939 from Schichau. The boat was laid down on 10 May 1941 at their Elbing, East Prussia, shipyard as yard number 1485, launched on 26 March 1942 and commissioned on 28 February 1943. After working up, T26 and her sister  departed for Western France on 30 August 1943.

Battle of Sept-Îles

T22s hydrophones detected the British ships off the Sept-Îles at 00:25 and Korvettenkapitän Franz Kohlauf maneuvered his flotilla to intercept them before they could reach Münsterland. Limbourne overheard the radio transmissions about 01:20 as the German ships turned, and alerted the other British ships. About this time, T23 spotted Charybdis silhouetted against the lighter horizon and Kohlauf ordered every boat to fire all of their torpedoes. Two of these struck the cruiser, which sank shortly afterwards, and another blew the bow off Limbourne, which had to be scuttled later. The loss of the flagship threw the British into confusion as they had not worked together before the attack, and the torpedo boats successfully disengaged before the senior surviving British captain realized that he was in command.

Battle of the Bay of Biscay

On 24–26 December T26 was one of the escorts for the  blockade runner  through the Bay of Biscay. Another blockade runner, the  refrigerated cargo ship , trailed Osorno by several days and four destroyers of the 8th Destroyer Flotilla and the six torpedo boats of the 4th Flotilla set sail on 27 December to escort her through the Bay. The Allies were aware of these blockade runners through their Ultra code-breaking efforts and positioned cruisers and aircraft in the Western Atlantic to intercept them in Operation Stonewall. A Consolidated B-24 Liberator heavy bomber from No. 311 Squadron RAF sank Alsterufer later that afternoon.

The German ships were unaware of the sinking until the following afternoon and continued onward to the rendezvous point. By this time, the weather had gotten significantly worse and the German ships were steaming for home, hampered by the rough seas that threw sea spray over their forward guns which made their operation difficult. It also severely reduced visibility and hampered the rangefinders and sights for the guns and torpedoes. About that time, the destroyers began firing back with guns and torpedoes; the latter all missed and one hit was made on Glasgow at 14:05. The cruisers pursued them with Enterprise crippling Z27 and Glasgow severely damaging T25. Both cruisers then switch targets to T26 and she was sunk by a torpedo from Enterprise at 16:00 with the loss of 90 crewmen. Several hundred survivors from Z27, T25 and T26 were rescued by the Irish merchantman , the British minesweeper  and two Spanish destroyers, but the precise breakdown of which survivors belonged to which ship is not available.

Notes

Citations

References

Further reading

External links
 T26 at german navy.de

Type 39 torpedo boats
World War II shipwrecks in the Atlantic Ocean
Maritime incidents in December 1943
1942 ships
Ships built by Schichau
Ships built in Elbing